Livistona benthamii is a species of palm. This species is natural distribution is from Cape York to the Archer River in Queensland, the Northern Territory and New Guinea.  It is a solitary palm found in open forest near areas that are annually inundated. An example may be seen on the Freshwater lake Walk at the Cairns aka. Flecker Botanical Garden.

References

External links
pacsoa.org.au

benthamii
Flora of Queensland
Flora of the Northern Territory
Flora of New Guinea
Plants described in 1902